Serghei Gheorghiev (born 20 October 1991) in Chirsova is a Moldovan footballer who plays as a midfielder for Navbahor Namangan in the Uzbek League and the Moldova national football team.

Club career

FC Sheriff
In 2008 Gheorghiev signed for Divizia Naţională outfit Sheriff Tiraspol.

In March 2015, Gheorghiev was loaned to Uzbek side Navbahor Namangan for the remainder of 2015.

International career
On 9 February 2011 he made his debut for the Moldova national football team in a friendly match against Andorra

References

External links
 
 

1991 births
Living people
Moldovan footballers
Moldovan people of Bulgarian descent
Moldova international footballers
FC Sheriff Tiraspol players
Moldovan Super Liga players
Association football midfielders
Uzbekistan Super League players